Manotes is a genus of flowering plants belonging to the family Connaraceae.

Its native range is Western Tropical Africa to Angola.

Species
Species:

Manotes expansa 
Manotes griffoniana 
Manotes lomamiensis 
Manotes macrantha 
Manotes soyauxii

References

Connaraceae
Oxalidales genera